The Jabori Hydro Power project is a planned hydro power project, currently under construction in the Jabori District of Mansehra, KPK, Pakistan.

References

Hydroelectric power stations in Pakistan